Anisosepalum is a genus of flowering plants belonging to the family Acanthaceae.

Its native range is Western Central Tropical Africa to Uganda and Zambia.

Species:

Anisosepalum alboviolaceum 
Anisosepalum humbertii 
Anisosepalum lewallei

References

Acanthaceae
Acanthaceae genera